Blue Mesa is an album by American fiddle and mandolin player Peter Ostroushko, released in 1989.

Track listing 
 "International Medley:Lost Indian/Reel of the Hanged Man" (Traditional) – 5:27
 "Marjorie's Waltz, No. 2" (Ostroushko) – 3:35
 "Horizontal Hold" (Garrison Keillor, Ostroushko) – 4:13
 "Irish Medley: Sweeps Hornpipe/The Scholar/Ban Anti AR Lar	" (Traditional) – 4:25
 "The Orthodox Priest" (Ostroushko) – 3:01
 "Polka Medley: The Charleston Polka/The B.T. Polka" (Ostroushko) – 4:20
 "Bonnie Mulligan's" (Ostroushko) – 3:54
 "Monkey on a Dog Cart" (Traditional) – 2:04
 "Bury Me Beneath the Willow" (Traditional) – 4:51
 "The Highwire Hornpipe" (Ostroushko) – 3:26
 "Ukrainian Medley" (Traditional) – 3:48
 "Blue Mesa" (Ostroushko) – 4:15
 "Jig Medley: Ostroushko's #1/Ostroushko's #2" (Ostroushko) – 4:04

Personnel
Peter Ostroushko – mandolin, fiddle, mandola, mandocello, vocals
Norman Blake – guitar
Nancy Blake – cello
Bruce Calin – bass
Dean Magraw – guitar
Daíthí Sproule – guitar
Paddy O'Brien – accordion
John Anderson – bodhrán
Sean O'Driscoll – banjo, tenor banjo

Production notes
Peter Ostroushko – producer, mixing
Bob Feldman – executive producer
Tom Mudge – engineer, mixing
Marge Ostroushko – mixing
John Scherf – assistant engineer
Craig Thorson – assistant engineer
Ann Marsden – photography
George Ostroushko – artwork, design, illustrations

References

1989 albums
Peter Ostroushko albums
Red House Records albums